Slaithwaite railway station serves the village of Slaithwaite near Huddersfield, West Yorkshire, England.

The station is situated between the centre of the village and the "Hill Top" residential area. The station has two platforms with a car park and bus stop at the approach to Platform 2. The current station was opened on 13 December 1982 by Metro (the West Yorkshire Passenger Transport Executive) and British Rail. The Huddersfield-bound platform is on the site of an earlier four platform station which opened in 1849 and closed on 7 October 1968. The current Stalybridge-bound platform is on the site of the old goods yard.

This station is operated by Northern Trains but Transpennine Express is the sole operator serving the station.

Facilities
The station is unmanned. As of November 2018, tickets can be purchased from one of two Ticket Vending Machines situated on the station. These are located on each of the two platforms, offering a better provision than that which was removed from the eastbound platform in July 2018. There are shelters on both platforms, along with timetable poster boards and digital information displays. Train running information can also be obtained by telephone. Step-free access to both platforms (which are staggered) is available via ramps from the nearby road (westbound) or through the station car park (eastbound). Access to the westbound platform is via the car park, and to the eastbound from the nearby road by crossing under the railway bridge.

Platforms on both Eastbound and Westbound sides of the station were extended in May 2018 and can now accommodate up to four carriages, enabling the use of six-car trains (pairs of three-car sets). Following a period of having no shelters, in September 2018, new passenger shelters were erected on both the west and eastbound platforms by the station's operator Northern.

Services
As of December 2018, Slaithwaite is served by an hourly TransPennine Express service between Manchester Piccadilly and  throughout the week (including Sundays).

Additional trains call at Slaithwaite during the AM and PM peak.

References

Gallery

External links

Railway stations in Huddersfield
DfT Category F2 stations
Former London and North Western Railway stations
Railway stations in Great Britain opened in 1849
Railway stations in Great Britain closed in 1968
Beeching closures in England
Reopened railway stations in Great Britain
Railway stations in Great Britain opened in 1982
1982 establishments in England
Railway stations served by TransPennine Express
Colne Valley
Railway stations in Great Britain not served by their managing company